Francesca Di Giovanni (born 24 March 1953), is an Italian lawyer who has worked in the Secretariat of State of the Holy See since 1993. In January 2020 she was appointed by Pope Francis to serve as the Undersecretary for Multilateral Affairs in the Section for Relations with States, becoming the first woman to hold a managerial position in that branch of the Roman Curia.

Biography
Di Giovanni was born on 24 March 1953 in Palermo. She studied law and completed her training as a notary. She then worked in the administration of the international center of the Focolare Movement. On 15 September 1993, she joined the Secretariat of State of the Holy See, where she worked in the field of multilateral relations. Her responsibilities included refugee and migration issues as well as international human rights, communications, private law, the position of women, copyright issues, and tourism.

On 15 January 2020, Pope Francis appointed her an Undersecretary for Multilateral Affairs in the Section for Relations with States of the Secretariat of State. She is the first woman and the first lay person to hold a managerial position in the Secretariat of State, a position normally reserved for a member of the clergy. Her responsibilities include the Holy See's interests in intergovernmental organizations and international treaties, while the bilateral sector is headed by another undersecretary, Mirosław Wachowski, a Polish cleric.

Notes

References

External links 

Living people
1953 births
20th-century Italian lawyers
20th-century women lawyers
21st-century Italian lawyers
21st-century women lawyers
Italian Roman Catholics
Italian women lawyers
Jurists from Palermo
Women officials of the Roman Curia